The State Administration of Science, Technology and Industry for National Defense (SASTIND) is a civilian ministry within the State Council of the People's Republic of China and is a subordinate agency of the Chinese Ministry of Industry and Information Technology and the superseding agency of the Commission for Science, Technology and Industry for National Defense (COSTIND). It was created by the Plan for Restructuring the State Council passed by the First Session of the Eleventh National People's Congress in 2008.

International cooperation

In July 2018, the State Administration for Science, Technology and Industry for National Defence signed an agreement with the Government of Kuwait to increase cooperation in the defense industry.

Related institutions 
 State Council agencies
Some of its subordinate agencies are thought to include:
 the China Atomic Energy Authority (CAEA)
 the China National Space Administration (CNSA)

 National universities
Several universities were thought to be administered by its predecessor COSTIND:
 Beijing Institute of Technology
 Beijing University of Aeronautics and Astronautics
 Harbin Engineering University
 Harbin Institute of Technology
 Northwestern Polytechnical University
 Nanjing Aeronautics and Astronautics University
 Nanjing University of Science and Technology

 State-owned enterprises 
Several enterprises were thought to be administered by its predecessor COSTIND:
 China Aviation Industry Corporation I
 China Aviation Industry Corporation II
 China North Industries Group Corporation
 China South Industries Group Corporation
 China Shipbuilding Industry Corporation
 China State Shipbuilding Corporation
 China Aerospace Science and Technology Corporation
 China Aerospace Machinery and Electronics Corporation
 China National Nuclear Corporation
 China Electronics Technology Corporation
 China Nuclear Engineering & Construction Group

References

External links 
 State Administration for Science, Technology and Industry for National Defense (SASTIND) from the Nuclear Threat Initiative

2008 establishments in China
Military acquisition
Military of the People's Republic of China
Ministry of Industry and Information Technology